Alexandre (Arordi) Varbedian (born June 11, 1943 in Marseille, France) is a French-Armenian Armenologist, ethnologist, essentialist and ontologist.

Early life
Varbedian was born in a family with roots from Khoy and Sasun-Bitlis and re-emigrated into Armenia in 1948. In 1968 he graduated from Architectural Department of the Yerevan Polytechnic Institute; and in 1970 from the actor department of studio "Hayfilm". In 1975 after moving back to Marseille he continued his professional activities as an architect, and his ethnological activities as a producer, writer, public speaker, but primarily as an Armenologist, ethnologist and essentialist.

Mr. Varbetian is a recipient of national and international awards in the first three fields mentioned above.

Personal works

Mr. Varbedian has written for around 50 Armenian, Diaspora and foreign periodicals, he was editor of the London based biweekly "Erebuni" (1987), the first issue of the ethnological journal "Eutyun" (lit. Essence) (Yerevan - 1992). He founded and led the French-Armenian theatrical group "Arvestanoc Sevak" (1978–1981, award winner of JAF-80 Paris Festival). He was founder of the Diaspora "Haratevman Ukht" union (1986–1990) and the expanded form of that organization with involvement well-known members of the Armenian intelligentsia. He was also founder of "Eutyun" -  Temple of National Wisdom (Armenia, since 1990).

He had presentations, radio and television programs and numerous activities in Armenia, in almost all centers of the Diaspora and in foreign universities. And the main theme of all those is the eternity of the Armenian nation, the programming and disclosure of its main patterns, the presentation and indoctrination of the importance of a national identity.

He authored:

 The lyrics Solarius, dedicated to the destiny of the Armenian nation (Marseille - 1985, formerly a movie script).
 Armenological study, Who are finally the Aryans? (Marseille - 1988, Yerevan - 1990).
 Volume of poems titled Evocation (Yerevan - 1990).
 An exploratory collection titled Identity (Yerevan - 1993).
 Theory of Essence (Yerevan - 1995).
 National ideological study titled Aryagank (Yerevan - 1997).
 A profound study titled Genesis-Aya, his magnum opus meticulously narrates the 12,000 year history of the Armenian nation and the beginnings of the present Human Civilization in the highlands of Armenia (Yerevan - 2000 second edition: Yerevan - 2003).
 The millennium program Eagank ("Nation and New Millennium" - volume 1, Yerevan - 2002).
 Public article titled National Crossword or who Alexandre Arordi Varbetian Is Disturbing? (Yerevan - 2003).
 The volume Qualitas (Yerevan - 2004).
 The collections of aphorisms Tombstone (Yerevan - 2005).
 The Letter E Name of AY ("Revelation", Eagank volume 2, Yerevan - 2006).
 "Dispelling the mystery of Delphic E'i" (Part I, Yerevan-1993).
 "What Plato did not know?" (Part II, Yerevan-2011).
 "The enigma of 27 October" (Los Angeles-2013).
 "As long as Kashchey the Deatless is alive"( Los Angeles-2015).
 "And know thing of my..." (Anthology of works, Yerevan-2015)
 "AXIS MUNDI- The enigma of Gobekli Tepe" (in English & in Armenian,Yerevan-2016 ).

The following works are ready, but not yet subject to publication:

 Meridian (Eagank, volume 2).
 Horse's peace (Eagank, volume 4).
 The volume Destiny is in the stage of preparation.

His works were recognized  by Garzu, S. Paradjanov, M. Ragon, A. Terterian, C. Paren, H. Shiraz, H. Sahyan, academicians such as Victor Hambardzumyan, V. Ivanov, S. Yeremyan and about sixty other Armenian and foreign famous individuals. British-Armenian producer H. Pilikyan labeled him as "genius Armenian ambassador with diapason of Shakespeare," ("Ashkharh" - France, "Zartonk" - Lebanon, 1985). Late Vahe Oshakan referred him as "one of very few imaginative, precious and courageous parts of Armenian history" (Asbarez 13-20.03 1999, United States). Armenian academician Varazdad Haroutyunyan praised him as a "national phenomenon" (in the section devoted to Varbedian of his "My Contemporaries" volume) and others as "the next representative of the Armenian Ideology after R. Patkanyan, H. Asatryan and Garegin Nzhdeh" ("Hayastani Hanrapetutyun" daily, 30.03.1999).

Sevak Aramazd (Hovanisyan-Germany) is describing him as "presenters of the Armenian Soul jailed in dark caves, the greatest names of a small group of "outstanding thinkers" - D. Varujan, K. Zaryan, G. Njdeh and A. Varbetian" ("Garun" March 2003).
Nevertheless, starting from 2002 Alexandre Varbedian's entry to the Motherland is strictly forbidden ...

Notable quote(s)

<blockquote>
...To really live...is to live in harmony with our true divine essence...
with the divine spark shining bright from the innermost depth of 
our Soul-Spirit...an individual who does not know 
[Know...Gnosis] and lives his or her life 
in tune with the quintessential Cosmic Laws will never achieve oneness 
with our true Self/Source... but will merely exist in an imbalanced,
unnatural and unhealthy mode 
so, ignorance is not bliss... ignorance is death...

 Alexandre A. Varbedian

Alexandre A. VARBEDIAN is the author of the EIZM

                                                        THE EIZM
                                          ( theory of essence or theory of everything)

    The Eizm is an essentialistic doctrine, a synthesis of ancient paganistic systems, different currents of religious, philosophical and/or classical concepts various metaphysical or esoteric schools, scientific theories, and cosmological hypotheses. With the Hegelian principle of thesis, antithesis, and synthesis, Materialism and Idealism are also coincident with each other and together, in harmony, they solve the apple of discord of all time, which is «the fundamental question of philosophy» ; Materialism as material (matter, energy, physical or biological factors etc....) and idealism (mind, information, essence etc....) as philosophies of immaterial states.

      In other words, it is neither theism, nor atheism but simply the Eizm. Hence, if philosophy is the science of all sciences, then Eizm is the philosophy of all philosophies. Generally, it is a new perspective, a complete viewpoint of the universum. Simply put, if philosophy is merely extracted from nature and life experience, then the Eizm is extracted not only from the above mentioned, but also from the universal acquaintance/ understanding of modern sciences and especially of cosmology.

As Aristotle said: «...And since wisdom has been defined as the origin and the most deserving of recognition, then wisdom must be taken as knowledge of the essence». (Aristotle, Metaphysics, Book 3, Chapter 2).
In another context, «There is no higher religion than the truth» (the motto of Theosophy).And «There is no higher truth than the essence» for the essence is the absolute truth but also the law and the regularity («internal relations under the appearances», «Philosophical Glossary», M.M. Rozental & P.F.Judin, Moscou 1963, article «Law»).
 
In addition to these, Plato's prototype of eydos, Aristote's «essence and phenomenon», the antique quintessence-fivefold, is the same in Hinduism, Brahman, in Taoism, Dao, Spinoza's «causa sui», Kant's «noumenon» (thing of himself ), A. Schopenhauer's (20th century philosopher) «will of himself», Husserl's theory of Eidetic Reduction, and the much earlier, Sumerian Anunnaki God Enki (Akkadian Ea, Armenian Haya), and many more undiscovered and unknown ancient depths.
 
    And if according to F. Engels  «Being determines Consciousness», which is right for immature beings, then for the Essence and maturely developed beings it is the «Consciousness that defines the being».
The Essence remains an open and wide system capable of expanding, deepening, complementing or adjusting parallel to the continuous development of science and cosmology.
   The author and founder of the essence is the French-Armenian architect, theatrical figure, writer, but mainly an ethnographer and essentialist Alexander Varbedian. He is also the author of numerous works (18 volumes and several original monographs), including the «ESSENCE» (« Theory of everything», Yerevan, 1995). Other series of extraordinary discoveries, as well as the elucidation of the mysterious Göbekli Tepe site, were written on the basis of Essence.
Moreover, there isn't a more complete and embracing concept of the superiority creation than that of the essence, which, unlike God, an Inaccessible, Improbable Substance, comprehends and includes not only all of them, the superhuman spirit, the wisdom, the universum, but also scientific, philosophical and even strict human concepts, such as the spirit, the internal world and the microcosm ...

Personal life

Mr. Varbedian is nonpartisan, has two sons and two grandchildren.

References
 http://www.eutyun.org/S/E/BANs/Ban-3.htm
http://thevoicekid.com/videos-%D4%B1%D5%AC%D5%A5%D6%84%D5%BD%D5%A1%D5%B6%D5%A4%D6%80-%D4%B1%D6%80%D5%B8%D6%80%D5%A4%D5%AB-%D5%8E%D5%A1%D6%80%D5%BA%D5%A5%D5%BF%D5%B5%D5%A1%D5%B6.html

External links
 http://www.eutyun.org/S/E/BANs/Ban%207.htm
 http://hetq.am/arm/news/25112/aleqsandr-varpetyany-hh-i-hamar-persona-non-grata-e-inchu.htm
 http://musavat.com/news/gundem/Mehri-razilasmasi-gizlinlerini-acan-ermeni-etnoqraf-Irevana-buraxilmadi_148475.html?welcome=2
http://draft.hayazg.info/%D0%92%D0%B0%D1%80%D0%BF%D0%B5%D1%82%D1%8F%D0%BD_%D0%90%D0%BB%D0%B5%D0%BA%D1%81%D0%B0%D0%BD%D0%B4%D1%80#.D0.91.D0.B8.D0.B1.D0.BB.D0.B8.D0.BE.D0.B3.D1.80.D0.B0.D1.84.D0.B8.D1.8F
 http://www.eutyun.org/S/X/HZ/HZ_dictatura Mudrosti_AleqsandrVarpetyan.htm
 http://www.eutyun.org/S/2/AVG/AVG_100316_Sarkozi%202.htm
 http://www.eutyun.org/S/E/GN/NYS_En.htm
 http://blogian.hayastan.com/2007/06/19/armenia-aryan-genealogist-blacklisted/
 http://www.eutyun.org/S/X/HZ/HZ_Inqnachanachum%20engl_AleqsandrVarpetyan.htm
 http://www.glendalearts.org/event/armenian-book-presentation-%d5%b0%d5%a1%d5%b6%d5%a4%d5%ab%d5%ba%d5%b8%d6%82%d5%b4-%d5%b0%d5%a5%d5%b2%d5%ab%d5%b6%d5%a1%d5%af-%d5%a1%d5%ac%d5%a5%d6%84%d5%bd%d5%a1%d5%b6%d5%a4%d6%80-%d5%a1%d6%80%d5%b8

1943 births
Living people
Writers from Marseille
French people of Armenian descent
French ethnologists
National Polytechnic University of Armenia alumni